Hynobius shinichisatoi, the Sobo salamander, has only been found in streams in the Sobo, Katamuki and Okue Biosphere Reserve, Japan. It is black in colour. 

It had previously been described as:

Pachypalaminus boulengeri Satō, 1954
Hynobius (Pachypalaminus) boulengeri partim Nakamura & Ueno, 1963
Hynobius boulengeri partim Nishikawa et al., 2001

Thus see also Hynobius boulengeri.

External Link
Article explaining the wide divergence of Hynobius salamaders in Honshu from the late Miocene

References

shinichisatoi
Endemic amphibians of Japan
Amphibians described in 2014